Idyllwild, Pine Cove, and Fern Valley are three adjacent unincorporated communities in the San Jacinto Mountains in Riverside County, California, United States. Idyllwild is the largest of the three. For statistical purposes, the United States Census Bureau has defined Idyllwild–Pine Cove as a census-designated place (CDP). The CDP's population was 3,874 at the 2010 census, up from 3,504 as of the 2000 census.

Idyllwild is on the Pacific Crest Trail.

"Mile-high Idyllwild" is a mountain resort about one mile (1600 m) in altitude. Idyllwild is flanked by two large rock formations, Tahquitz Rock (also known as Lily Rock) and Suicide Rock, which are famous in Southern California rock-climbing circles. It offers no skiing, so "the Hill" has been minimally developed over the years and remains a center for hiking, mountain and rock climbing, mountain biking, and horseback riding.

History
Idyllwild was once the summer home for bands of Cahuilla Indians, who migrated there to escape the heat of lower-elevation deserts. The Cahuilla's grinding slabs can still be seen in Idyllwild.

A Cahuilla legend recounts how tribesmen chanted over the body of their fallen chieftain Tahquitz, or Takwish, who had been possessed by an evil spirit and killed his sweetheart. Suddenly his body began to glow like fire, and he rose and settled on Idyllwild's Tahquitz Rock. According to the legend, Tahquitz is trapped beneath the rock with a rattlesnake and a condor for company, and when the mountain shakes and trembles, it is not an earthquake, but Tahquitz up to his evil tricks on Tahquitz Rock.

Idyllwild was originally known as Strawberry Valley because of the wild strawberries that grow there, especially beside the creek that runs through the town, Strawberry Creek. Shepherds regularly brought their flocks to the valley. In the 1880s, the Domenigoni family of San Jacinto homesteaded land near what is now Idyllwild Arts Academy. In 1889, George and Sarah Hannahs built a summer camp next to their sawmill in upper Dutch Flat and named it Camp Idyllwilde. By the 1890s a toll road had been built from Hemet, which opened Idyllwild to settlement, logging, and tourism. A post office was established in 1893; at this time, the town was called Rayneta after the Hannahs' son Raymond.

In 1901, the Idyllwild Sanatorium was built to treat tuberculosis patients. It was soon remodeled as a resort called Idyllwild Among the Pines, and later Idyllwild. The same year, the town's name was changed to Idyllwild.

The Tribe of Tahquitz Boy Scout honor society was created in Idyllwild in 1925.

With the advent of the automobile, Idyllwild became a weekend tourist attraction for Southern Californians. For many years, the town presented itself as an alpine village, and hotels and businesses had German or German-sounding names, but this practice ended during World War II.

From the 1930s to the 1950s, Idyllwild was a center for the production of "knotty pine furniture", the fine log furniture made in the Arts and Crafts style. Under Charles "Selden" Belden's direction, the furniture was produced by the Idyllwild Pinecraft Furniture Company and, later, C. Selden Belden Idyllwild Pinecraft. The furniture is now "collectible" and can be found in many Idyllwild houses and cabins.

In the 1950s, the Yosemite Decimal System of grading routes was developed at Tahquitz by members of the Rock Climbing Section of the Angeles Chapter of the Sierra Club. In 1957 architect Frank Gehry designed and constructed his first private residence. Built along with USC classmate/architect Greg Walsh, The David Cabin shows early inspirational Asian influences and characteristics of Gehry's later works, including unfinished ceiling beams and other exposed materials. It is on Middle Ridge Drive.

In the late 1960s and 1970s, there was an influx of hippies to Idyllwild that changed the town and alarmed many longtime residents. Timothy Leary lived on a ranch in nearby Garner Valley, with the ranch serving as the headquarters of The Brotherhood of Eternal Love. In 2019 YouTube celebrity Logan Paul bought the ranch.

From 1974 to 1979, Idyllwild hosted the Idyllwild Bluegrass Invitational, then Southern California's only bluegrass music festival (it was inspired by the Julian Banjo-Fiddle Contest, which takes place on the third weekend in September). From the 1950s through the 1970s Idyllwild also hosted the Bear Flag Festival, which honored California's Bear Flag and marked the passing of the grizzly bear from California, the last of which, according to local legend, was killed at Hurkey Creek in Garner Valley.

Since the 1950s, some Idyllwild parents have agitated for a high school in the town, and there have been many attempts at establishing high schools, but most were short-lived. Startup schools that failed included Hi-Lo, or LIFE (Living in Free Education, a public school where Idyllwild Arts Academy now stands, operated by Mary Glavin in 1973–76), New Schole Ranch (a private school in Mountain Center), and Freedom Schools, Inc. (a private school operated in Mountain Center by Mary Ellen DuBay). Desert Sun School (later called the Elliott-Pope School), a private boarding school that accepted boarders and day students, closed in December 1990, due to financial mischief, after operating for 65 years.

Idyllwild, Garner Valley and Lake Hemet have been used for filming since the silent film era. Although most of Cecil B. DeMille's The Squaw Man (1914) was filmed in the Los Angeles vicinity, footage of cattle on the open range were shot at the "H.J." Ranch at Keen Camp, midway between Idyllwild and Garner Valley. A number of Westerns have been filmed at the Garner Ranch in Garner Valley: Guns and Guitars (1936), Heading for the Rio Grande (1936), Springtime in the Rockies (1937), Brothers in the Saddle (1949), Riders of the Range (1949), and Storm over Wyoming (1950). The Garner Ranch also stood in for the Ponderosa in episodes of the TV show Bonanza. In 1961 and 1962, the Elvis Presley musical Kid Galahad was filmed in the Idyllwild vicinity. The 1980s television series Air Wolf and various car commercials were also filmed in the area. The biker funeral procession from the 1966 film The Wild Angels was filmed in Idyllwild and included the Silver Pines Lodge, which was named Hillbilly Lodge at the time of filming. Some of Steven Suptic's Sugar Pine 7, a YouTube comedy series, takes place in Idyllwild.

Idyllwild was listed in the 1998 book 100 Best Small Art Towns in America, by John Villani.

In 2012, a Golden Retriever named Max was elected as the "Mayor" of Idyllwild (which, as part of an unincorporated community, has no local government) out of a running of fourteen dogs and two cats as part of a fundraising event held by and for the non-profit organization Idyllwild Animal Rescue Friends (ARF). In 2013, Mayor Max died, and Maximus Mighty Dog Mueller II, another Golden Retriever, arrived in Idyllwild to complete the remainder of the term. In March 2014, as the end of Max's term approached, ARF solicited the town's interest in holding another election, after which Mayor Max II became Mayor in perpetuity. Mayor Max II died on July 30, 2022, after a brief medical issue.

Geography
The Idyllwild–Pine Cove–Fern Valley CDP in Southern California's San Jacinto Mountains as defined by the United States Census Bureau statistical purposes may not precisely correspond to local understanding of the areas with the same names.

Idyllwild lies mostly within a high mountain valley bisected by a small year-round stream, Strawberry Creek.

Pine Cove occupies a ridgetop location nearly  higher than Idyllwild.

Flora and fauna
Ancient ponderosa pine is the major flora of the area. Many other plant species are known to occur in the area too, such as the California incense-cedar, Bigcone Douglas fir, and California black oak. Rainbow trout occur in Lake Fulmor and Strawberry Creek, and Mule deer, Squirrels, and Chipmunks roam the forest.

Climate 
Under the Köppen climate classification system, Idyllwild–Pine Cove has a warm-summer Mediterranean climate, abbreviated "Csb" on climate maps. Winter is cool with occasional rain storms and snow showers. Spring starts slowly but then gets warmer in April and is usually a pleasant time of year.

Summer is hot and dry, but temperatures cool off to below  at night and days are more similar to the coastal areas than to the deserts. An average of 17.7 days a year exceed , very low for inland California. Late summer brings occasional thunderstorms from the North American Monsoon. Fall is warm and dry, with the first freezes by October and the first snows by November.

With only  of rain, 1961 was the driest year on record.

Snow falls every winter. There has never been a snowless season on record. The  of snow in 1983–1984 was the least snowy season ever.

Demographics

The 2010 United States Census reported that Idyllwild–Pine Cove CDP had a population of 3,874. The racial makeup of Idyllwild–Pine Cove CDP was 3,434 (89%) White, 32 (1%) African American, 30 (1%) Native American, 135 (4%) Asian, 6 (<1%) Pacific Islander, 88 (2%) from other races, and 149 (4%) from two or more races. Hispanic or Latino of any race were 479 persons (12%).

The Census reported that 3,527 people (91% of the population) lived in households, 347 (9%) lived in non-institutionalized group quarters, and 0 (0%) were institutionalized.

There were 1,682 households, out of which 314 (19%) had children under the age of 18 living in them, 793 (47%) were opposite-sex married couples living together, 111 (7%) had a female householder with no husband present, 75 (5%) had a male householder with no wife present.  There were 94 (6%) unmarried opposite-sex partnerships, and 44 (3%) same-sex married couples or partnerships. 542 households (32%) were made up of individuals, and 225 (13%) had someone living alone who was 65 years of age or older. The average household size was 2.10.  There were 979 families (58% of all households); the average family size was 2.62.

The population was spread out, with 741 people (19%) under the age of 18, 285 people (7%) aged 18 to 24, 652 people (17%) aged 25 to 44, 1,423 people (34%) aged 45 to 64, and 773 people (20%) who were 65 years of age or older.  The median age was 49.8 years. For every 100 females, there were 99.2 males.  For every 100 females age 18 and over, there were 102.4 males.

The homeowner vacancy rate was 9%; the rental vacancy rate was 18%.  2,423 people (63% of the population) lived in owner-occupied housing units and 1,104 people (29%) lived in rental housing units.

Government

Local 
In the Riverside County Board of Supervisors, Fern Valley, Idyllwild, and Pine Cove are in the Third District, represented by Chuck Washington.
In the jurisdiction of the Riverside County Sheriff's Department, with Sheriff Chad Bianco.
The Idyllwild, Pine Cove, Fern Valley area has several local governmental agencies: Idyllwild County Water District, Pine Cove County Water District, Fern Valley State Water District, Idyllwild Fire Protection District, County Service Area 36, County Service Area 38 and Idyllwild Historical Preservation District.

Transportation
Forest Folk, using a grant from the Riverside County Transportation Commission, operates the Idyllwild Shuttle, which provides door-to-door service.

Education
 Idyllwild School is K–8 and part of Hemet Unified School District.
 Idyllwild Arts Academy is a private day and boarding high school with a focus in the arts.
 Hemet High School is part of Hemet Unified School District and is located in Hemet.

Parks and recreation
Idyllwild is within the San Bernardino National Forest and borders Mount San Jacinto State Park.

The Riverside County Regional Park and Open-Space District operates the Idyllwild Park and Idyllwild Nature Center.

Businesses and organizations 

In 1946, Ernie and Betty Maxwell founded the Idyllwild Town Crier weekly newspaper, which has been in continual operation ever since. Over the years, it has been variously owned and operated by local families, the Chronicle Publishing Company in San Francisco, and a U.S. corporate subsidiary of the Tindle Newspaper Group. Since June 28, 2013, the Town Crier has been owned and operated by Idyllwild House Publishing Company Ltd., a family-held California general corporation based in Idyllwild. The Town Crier is the sole media monitor of eight local governmental agencies on "the Hill," as the San Jacinto Mountain communities are locally known. The Idyllwild Town Crier has received awards from the National Newspaper Association, the California Newspaper Publishers Association, and the California Press Association, which are on display at its Village Center Drive office.

The Idyllwild Arts Foundation, which began as a summer arts program, was founded by Bea and Max Krone in 1950. It was administered by the University of Southern California (USC) from 1964 through 1985, when the program was known as ISOMATA - Idyllwild School of Music and the Arts. In 1985, the Foundation purchased ISOMATA from USC, and followed by the founding of the private Idyllwild Arts Foundation (IAF) in 1986. IAF is a private, fully accredited high school for boarding and day students.

Since 2010 Idyllwild hosts the Idyllwild International Festival of Cinema. The first festival screened around 40 official selections from around the world.

In 2013, the Stratford Players theater group moved to Idyllwild, where they perform year-round. Typically in the fall, the troupe presents Will In The Woods, a selection of Shakespeare's scenes and soliloquies. The event is held outdoors in the afternoon, in keeping with Elizabethan custom.  During the remainder of the year, Stratford Players present both staged readings and full productions of non-Shakespearean plays that vary from classics to recent works.

Camp Emerson, a Boy Scouts of America camp established in 1919, is located in Idyllwild.

Notable people
Idyllwild is home to many artists and musicians, notably drummer David Atwood of the 1970s rock group America, Bobby Womack, and Richard Halligan, a founding member of Blood, Sweat & Tears. Brian “Puke” Parnell - producer, musician and frontman of punk rock band Throw The Goat - has lived in Idyllwild since 2005. Musician, composer, and record producer Kenneth James Gibson has a studio in Idyllwild and has recorded multiple albums there. PGA tour star Brendan Steele was born and raised in Idyllwild. Artist Nate Lowman grew up in Idyllwild and attended Idyllwild Arts Academy before moving to New York. Musician and radio personality Chris Thile spent most of his childhood in Idyllwild (approximately 1985–1995). 

Film actors and producers who own or owned homes in Idyllwild and the surrounding area include Charles Laughton, Marjorie Main, Sharon Lawrence, Barbara Hershey, Conor O'Farrell, Doris Day, Michael J. Fox, Sean Connery, Dolly Parton, Herb Jeffries, Craig Stevens, Andrew Robinson, Shari Lewis, Doron Ofir, and Horace Hahn, who had a supporting role in the Cecil B. DeMille film This Day and Age (1933). American Idol season 10 contestant and musical artist Casey Abrams is from Idyllwild. Film director and screenwriter, Stephen Savage, also has a house in Idyllwild. Savage also founded the Idyllwild International Festival of Cinema, a film festival which celebrates its 13th year in 2022, and he is the author of California's Official State Outdoor Play. "Ramona".

References

External links
 
 Historic Resources Survey: Idyllwild Commercial Corridor
 
 Idyllwild Area Historical Society
 Idyllwild Information

Census-designated places in Riverside County, California
Idliiwild01
Census-designated places in California